Foreningen imod Lovbeskyttelse for Usædelighed (Association against the legal protection of prostitution), was the Danish branch of the British Ladies National Association for the Repeal of the Contagious Diseases Acts. It was established in 1879 with the purpose to repeal the so-called reglementation system, which required prostitute women to registration and regular medical examination to prevent sexually transmitted infections.

The reglementation system had been informally used by the Police in Copenhagen since 1815. When the system was given a permanent organization in 1863 and was finnally formally legalized in law in 1874, it attracted attention and disgust around the sexual double standard illustrated by the reglementation system.

The campaign was given a boost by the great scandal of 1895, when several police officers in the capital was exposed having used sex workers by functioning as their pimps and clients.

After the ban on brothels 1901 and the abolision of the reglementation system in 1906, the association regarded their goal to have been achieved, and dissolved itself.

See also
 Finska Federationen
 Svenska Federationen

References

Feminism and health
1879 establishments in Denmark
1906 disestablishments in Europe
19th century in Copenhagen
Feminist organizations in Denmark
Women's organizations based in Denmark
Venereal disease legislation
Prostitution in Denmark
Anti-prostitution activism